Megan Gilkes (born 6 November 2000 in Richmond Hill, Ontario) is a Canadian racing driver. She competed in the W Series in 2019.

Biography
A third-generation racer, Gilkes began karting aged nine in her then-home of Barbados. Following a break from racing after a crash in qualifying at the World Finals where she broke her wrist, she won the Ottawa Challenge Karting Cup in her home country of Canada, and finished runner up in the 2016 Eastern Canadian Karting Championship as an ambassador for Dare to be Different. In 2017, Gilkes stepped up to single-seaters in the Canadian F1200 championship. Despite not contesting all of the rounds in either season she competed in, she finished third and second overall in consecutive years. Also in 2017, Gilkes finished runner up in the Sports Car Club of America Southeast Majors championship, having led it for 10 of the 12 rounds.

In 2019, Gilkes applied for the W Series, a European-based Formula 3 championship solely for women. She was selected into the category as one of 18 full-time drivers, where she won the non-championship reverse grid race at TT Circuit Assen, and became the youngest W Series race winner, and only North American female driver to win a Formula 3 race in Europe. Gilkes returned to Canada in 2020, competing in the Ontario Formula 1600 Championship, where she had two pole positions, two fastest race laps and 13 podium finishes, and was runner up overall in the series.

Personal life
Gilkes' younger brother Nick who is currently competing in Eurocup-3 for Drivex.

Alongside her racing, she studies Aeronautical Engineering at the Imperial College in London.

Racing record

Career summary

SCCA National Championship Runoffs

Complete W Series results
(key) (Races in bold indicate pole position) (Races in italics indicate fastest lap)

Complete GB4 Championship results 
(key) (Races in bold indicate pole position) (Races in italics indicate fastest lap)

References

External links

 

Canadian racing drivers
2001 births
Living people
W Series drivers
Formula Regional Americas Championship drivers
SCCA National Championship Runoffs participants
Formula Ford drivers
GB4 Championship drivers
Canadian female racing drivers
Sportspeople from Richmond Hill, Ontario
F1 Academy drivers
Carlin racing drivers